Sumkhan Poamsombat (Thai สุขสยาม ชาญมณีเวช) is a Thai footballer. He plays for Thailand Premier League clubside Samut Songkhram FC.

See also
Football in Thailand
List of football clubs in Thailand

References

1979 births
Living people
Sumkhan Poamsombat
Association football midfielders